Gobio sibiricus is a species of gudgeon, a small freshwater in the family Cyprinidae. It was endemic to Mongolia, where it is found in Ob, Yenisei and Nura drainages.  A recent study has shown that this species is also found in the upper reaches of the Amu Darya in Uzbekistan.

References

Gobio
Fish described in 1936
Taxa named by Alexander Nikolsky